The eight U.S. regional fishery management councils are the primary forums for developing conservation and management measures for U.S. marine fisheries. The regional councils recommend management measures for fisheries in the Exclusive Economic Zone (EEZ); which are subject to approval and implemented by the National Marine Fisheries Service (NMFS).  The councils were established by the Magnuson-Stevens Fishery Conservation and Management Act in 1976. In 1996, revisions to the laws governing the regional fishery management councils were made by the Sustainable Fisheries Act, which includes provisions to reduce bycatch, consider the effects of management decisions on communities, and protect essential fish habitats.

The councils are composed of individuals with a stake in the fishery.  This includes federal and state officials, primarily from the National Marine Fisheries Service and the Fish and Wildlife Service.  Additionally, councils have at-large and obligatory members selected by state governors to represent non-government stakeholders and special interests such as commercial fishermen, fisheries scientists, and charter boat owners.

Notes

See also 
 Fisheries management
 North Pacific Fishery Management Council
 Western Pacific Regional Fishery Management Council

Nature conservation organizations based in the United States
Fisheries agencies